Mathew Devaris was a Greek scholar during the Renaissance.

He was born in Corfu but migrated to Rome Italy at a young age. He was a student of Janus Lascaris and is known to have published Eustathius of Thessalonica's scholia or commentary on Homer between 1542 and 1550.

Known works
Un premier catalogue des manuscrits grecs
...

References

See also
Greek scholars in the Renaissance

Writers from Corfu
Greek Renaissance humanists
16th-century Greek people
16th-century Greek writers
16th-century male writers
16th-century Greek educators